Chattogram Railway Station is a railway station in Bangladesh, situated at Battoli, Station Road of Chattogram District. It is one of the largest railway stations of the country. This station has an old and a new terminal.

Old terminal 

The old terminal was constructed during the British era. It comprises a two-storied 56.24 m long and 10.37 m wide station building, which was constructed on November 7, 1896.

New Terminal 
On September 30, 2013, modernization and remodeling of Chittagong Railway Station started. A new terminal was constructed beside the old terminal.

Operational trains 
The following passenger trains run from Chittagong Railway Station along with many freight trains:

 Subarna Express
 Mohanagar Provati/Godhuli Express
 Paharika Express
 Mohanagar Express
 Uddayan Express
 Meghna Express
 Turna Express
 Bijoy Express
 Sonar Bangla Express
 Dhaka-Chittagong Mail
 Karnaphuli Express
 Sagarika Express
 Mymensingh Express
 Chattala Express
 Nazirhat Commuter
 111/112/113/114 local
 123/124 local

See also 

 List of railway stations in Bangladesh

References 

Railway stations in Chittagong District
Chittagong